Frank C. Morse (April 8, 1859–after 1923) was a Washington state pioneer and state official. Morse was one of the first inhabitants of Colfax, Washington, coming to the small village in 1879 or 1880. He worked in the Lippitt Brothers trade company for ten years, but later changed his career path to occupy a number of official positions. He was appointed as postmaster of Colfax by President Harrison, and spent a few years as an assistant postmaster in Tacoma.

Morse lived in Olympia for many years. In Olympia, he served as the state bookkeeper, secretary of the state tax commission, assistant state commissioner of public lands, and a member of the management board for the Monroe State Reformatory. In 1913 he became the only Republican member of the State Board of Control. He served at the position from 1913 to 1916, resigning before his term expired. From 1919 until at least 1923, he worked in Fort Steilacoom as a deportation agent for non-resident insane, and was state asylums inspector.

Early life, family, and education

Frank Morse was born on April 8, 1859, on Mare Island in California, where the Navy shipyard was located. He spent all his life in the west. Growing up at the Navy yard, Morse witnessed preparation for war and the troop homecomings.

Morse's father, Charles A. Morse, came to San Francisco in 1856, appointed by President Lincoln to work as a Naval storekeeper on the Navy yard. Charles married Caroline M. Sawyer  from Haverhill, Massachusetts. Charles died in San Francisco in 1889, and Carilone died in Alameda, California in 1901. Several generations of the family lived in America, but their earlier ancestors were from England and Ireland.

Frank Morse attended St. Augustine College in Benicia, California. He studied there from 1874 to 1877.

Career

Morse's first job was with Californian agency for the Centemerie kid gloves, made in Paris. He worked at the agency for a little over a year.

States of Oregon and Washington

In 1879, Morse moved to Portland, Oregon, where he lived for seven months. Later, he relocated to Colfax, Washington, a recently-founded village. In Colfax, Morse worked for the Lippitt Brothers merchants for ten years.

In May 1889, Morse was appointed postmaster of Colfax by President Harrison. He worked at the position for five years. Afterwards, Morse became state bookkeeper, placed in the position by State Auditor Grimes under the management of Governor McGraw. Upon acquiring the position, Morse moved to Olympia and served there for three years.

In 1897, Morse moved to Tacoma. On September 17, 1899, he became assistant postmaster, working for John B. Cromwell.

Olympia

By 1908, Morse was back to Olympia, working as the secretary of the state tax commission. That year, he was offered a position of assistant state commissioner of public lands, and worked there under Commissioner E. W. Ross until 1913.

During the State Board of Control reorganization in 1913, Morse succeeded A. E. Cagwin to the Republican membership. He became the only Republican member of the board; the law required that the board was bipartisan and that the minority party was represented by one member. Morse began the position on June 11, 1913. The same year, he was a member of the management board for the Monroe State Reformatory.

Morse resigned from the State Board of Control  before his term expired. He left the office on December 31, 1916 and was succeeded by George Dowe McQuesten.

State deportation agency

In 1919, Morse was appointed to another state position: a deportation agent working with cases of non-resident insane. After World War I, state government planned to "enter upon a vigorous policy" of sending people back to their native countries. Morse worked as a state deportation agent in Fort Steilacoom until at least 1923. He was also an inspector for state asylums at the time.

Over the years in multiple official positions, Morse was known as a "very competent" specialist.

Personal life

In 1887, Morse married Mary Isabelle Sullivanin in Lewiston, Idaho. She was a sister of Judge Sullivan from Spokane and of Hon. P. C. Sullivan, a highly esteemed politician who was once a candidate for the position of Washington State governor.

The Morses had one child, who died at the age of two. The family lived in their home in Tacoma until their move to Olympia.

See also 

 Mare Island Naval Shipyard 
 Colfax, Washington 
 Fort Steilacoom

References

Literature cited 

1859 births
Washington (state) pioneers
People from Colfax, Washington
Tacoma, Washington
Washington (state) postmasters
People from Olympia, Washington
Bookkeepers
Year of death missing